The Band Swings – Lorez Sings is an album by American jazz vocalist Lorez Alexandria released by the King label in 1959.

Critical reception

AllMusic reviewer Ron Wynn said: "Decent set featuring the highly stylized, often erratic vocalist Lorez Alexandria doing conventional jazz and jazz-centered pop tunes and standards. She's backed by a capable band, and sometimes has some brilliant moments, but overall, Alexandria was an average vocalist."

Track listing
 "You're My Thrill" (Jay Gorney, Sidney Clare) – 2:06
 "Don't Blame Me" (Jimmy McHugh, Dorothy Fields) – 2:34
 "Ain't Misbehavin'" (Fats Waller, Andy Razaf, Harry Brooks) – 2:49
 "What Is This Thing Called Love?" (Cole Porter) – 3:01
 "Dancing on the Ceiling" (Richard Rodgers, Lorenz Hart) – 3:04
 "Love Is Just Around the Corner" (Lewis E. Gensler, Leo Robin) – 2:23
 "I'm Gonna Sit Right Down and Write Myself a Letter" (Fred E. Ahlert, Joe Young) – 2:05
 "Just You, Just Me" (Jesse Greer, Raymond Klages) – 2:17
 "All the Things You Are" (Jerome Kern, Oscar Hammerstein II) – 1:47
 "The Thrill Is Gone" (Ray Henderson, Lew Brown) – 2:15
 "My Baby Just Cares for Me" (Walter Donaldson, Gus Kahn) – 2:34

Personnel
Lorez Alexandria – vocals
Unidentified musicians

References 

King Records (United States) albums
Lorez Alexandria albums
1959 albums